Narcissus moleroi is a species of the genus Narcissus (daffodils) in the family Amaryllidaceae. It is classified in Section Pseudonarcissus. It is native to eastern Spain.

Description 
The flowers are pale yellow.

References

Bibliography 

Narcissus moleroi  The Plant List
Narcissus moleroi  World Checklist
Flora Catalana Narcissus moleroi (image)

moleroi
Garden plants
Flora of Spain